Stokesley is a market town and civil parish in the Hambleton District of North Yorkshire, England, formerly a part of the historic North Riding of Yorkshire. It lies on the River Leven. An electoral ward, of the same name, stretches north to Newby and had a population at the 2011 Census of 5,537.

Stokesley is about two miles south of the Middlesbrough borough boundary and eight miles south of Middlesbrough town centre. Stokesley is between Middlesbrough, Guisborough and Northallerton in a farming area. Local attractions nearby include Great Ayton, Captain Cook's monument and Roseberry Topping in the North York Moors National Park. The town was formerly one of the North Riding of Yorkshire's rural district head towns, this was from 1894 until 1974.

History

Stokesley was granted a charter to hold fairs in 1223 by Henry III. The Pack Horse Bridge crossing over the River Leven dates from the 17th century. Its large range of building types, including fine Georgian architecture has contributed to its character. Prominent historical features include the Mill Wheel, thought to represent the site of a mill recorded in the Domesday Book of 1086. Domesday also recorded "a church and priest" in Stokesley. Stokesley Town Hall was completed in 1853.

Economy

The historic High Street is lined with independent small shops and restaurants. Other facilities include a medium-sized Co-operative Food supermarket, showground, camping site, health centre, industrial estate, library, police and fire stations. The town has four pubs (The Queen's Head, The White Swan, The Mill and The Spread Eagle). Stokesley is also the home of Quorn, produced by Marlow Foods.

There are 80 grade II listed buildings, along with four Grade II* listed buildings of special architectural or historic interest. They are the former Barclays Bank, Handyside Cottage, the Manor House and the Old Rectory.

Agriculture

The inaugural meeting of Stokesley Agricultural Society was held at the Golden Lion Hotel, now The Leven Hotel, in 1859. The hotel was also used as the law court for the area being placed between Middlesbrough and Northallerton. Stokesley Agricultural Show, first held in 1859, is held every year on the third Saturday in September. It is one of the largest one day shows in the northern England. A weekly market is also held each Friday in the main square called the Plain, a farmers' market also takes place on the first Saturday of each month.

Fair

A four-day fair takes place in September in the town centre. The fair spans the full length of the high street and rides such as Speed Buzz, the Extreme, Vertigo, King Frog, Cyclone and various Crows rides attend. The fair begins on Wednesday evening and runs until the Saturday, opening all day on the Saturday at the same time as the annual agricultural show which takes place on the showground.

Religion

There are three churches in Stokesley. One of these, the Anglican Church of St Peter and St Paul, is the oldest building in town, and it is just off the Market Plain. It has a medieval tower and chancel, a Georgian nave built around 1777, colourful 20th-century stained glass and woodwork carved by the Mouseman of Kilburn.

Sport

The North Riding County FA is based in the town. The county FA formed in 1881. Stokesley Cricket Club play in the North Yorkshire and South Durham Cricket League. The local leisure centre has a swimming pool.

Transport
Stokesley is served by the Arriva North East service 28a from Middlesbrough every hour and the 81 from Marske Estate every hour. Abbott's of Leeming run services 80/89, which run every two hours. The services operate six days a week towards Northallerton and Romanby via Osmotherley.

Stokesley was served by rail and had a railway station and some sidings, on the Stockton-Picton-Battersby-Whitby branch. The station closed to passengers in June 1954, pre-dating the large scale closures of the Beeching cuts. Goods facilities remained until August 1965 when the line closed completely. The station featured in British Transport Films' "A Farmer Moves South" in 1951. The nearest railway station is now at Great Ayton.

Education 
Historic schools include Preston Grammar School in College Square: now a pizza takeaway. In 1918 it was closed for failing to reach the standards of an inspection; primarily caused by lack of funds. In general, children who passed exams at 11 years old, then went to Yarm Grammar School, with some Catholic pupils going to Middlesbrough under the old system.

Stokesley Primary School was created in 1908 and extended in 1973. It has about 550 pupils.

Stokesley School, was opened in 1959 for pupils between 11 and 18 was originally a secondary modern and became a comprehensive school in the 1970s. Later a sixth form college was incorporated. It has, at present, about 1,700 pupils. Alumni of Stokesley School include Labour politician Alan Milburn, 1988 Olympics runner Louise Stuart and Sky Sports News journalist and presenter David Jones.

Notable people
John Coates (1828–1870), cricketer
Jonathan Ruffer, financial expert, author, philanthropist

References

Further reading
 Stokesley and District Local History Study Group, Historical Glimpses of the Town of Stoxley, Stokesley and District Local History Study Group 1981
 The Stokesley Society, Old Stokesley, The Stokesley Society 1983
 Stokesley and District Local History Study Group, Stokesley in the 1860s: Aspects of Everyday Life, Stokesley and District Local History Study Group 1994.
 The Stokesley Scene Collection, New Book, Life in a Yorkshire Market Town with a foreword by the Rt. Hon. William Hague MP "The Stokesley Scene Collection: 30th Anniversary Limited Edition", 2008.

Videos
 A Scrapbook of Stokesley, The Stokesley Society 1998
 A Walk Round Old Stokesley with Maurice Wilson, The Stokesley Society 1995

External links

 Stokesley Info - Website for Stokesley and surrounding area new to 2011	
 Official Website
 The website of the Stokesley Heritage Group

 
Towns in North Yorkshire
Market towns in North Yorkshire
Civil parishes in North Yorkshire
Hambleton District